George Simpson (1883 - unknown) was an English professional footballer, who played for The Wednesday and West Bromwich Albion.

With Wednesday he won the Football League championship in 1903–04 and the FA Cup in 1907, scoring the winning goal in the final.

References

1883 births
Date of birth missing
Year of death missing
20th-century deaths
English footballers
English Football League players
Sportspeople from Jarrow
Footballers from Tyne and Wear
Sheffield Wednesday F.C. players
Jarrow F.C. players
West Bromwich Albion F.C. players
North Shields F.C. players
Association football outside forwards

FA Cup Final players